Mohamed Kohsrof (born 14 December 1965) is a former judoka, who represented North Yemen at the 1988 Summer Olympic Games in the extra lightweight class. He finished 35th.

References

External links
 

Judoka at the 1988 Summer Olympics
1965 births
Living people
Olympic judoka of North Yemen
Yemeni male judoka
Place of birth missing (living people)
20th-century Yemeni people